Anabolia is a genus of northern caddisflies in the family Limnephilidae. There are about 18 described species in Anabolia.

Species
These 18 species belong to the genus Anabolia:

 Anabolia apora Parker, 1984
 Anabolia appendix (Ulmer, 1905)
 Anabolia bimaculata (Walker, 1852)
 Anabolia brevipennis (Curtis, 1834)
 Anabolia concentrica (Zetterstedt, 1840)
 Anabolia consocia (Walker, 1852)
 Anabolia furcata Brauer, 1857
 Anabolia kawamurai Iwata, 1927
 Anabolia laevis (Zetterstedt, 1840)
 Anabolia lombarda Ris, 1897
 Anabolia nervosa (Curtis, 1834)
 Anabolia oculata Martynov, 1909
 Anabolia ozburni Milne, 1935
 Anabolia semenovi (Martynov, 1935)
 Anabolia servata (McLachlan, 1880)
 Anabolia sordida Hagen, 1861
 Anabolia soror McLachlan, 1875
 Anabolia subquadrata Martynov, 1930

References

Further reading

External links

 

Trichoptera genera
Articles created by Qbugbot
Integripalpia